In England, Sites of Special Scientific Interest (SSSIs) are designated by Natural England, which is responsible for protecting England's natural environment. Designation as an SSSI gives legal protection to the most important wildlife and geological sites. As of May 2020 there are 163 SSSIs in Norfolk, out of which 123 are biological, 25 are geological and 15 are both biological and geological.

Sixty-one sites are Special Areas of Conservation, forty-four are Special Protection Areas, thirty-two are  Ramsar sites, forty are Geological Conservation Review sites, thirty-five are Nature Conservation Review sites, eighteen are national nature reserves, ten are local nature reserves, twenty-eight are in Areas of Outstanding Natural Beauty, one is on the Register of Historic Parks and Gardens and three contain scheduled monuments. Twenty-two sites are managed by the Norfolk Wildlife Trust, one by the Suffolk Wildlife Trust, three by the National Trust, one by the Royal Society for the Protection of Birds and one by the Wildfowl & Wetlands Trust.

Norfolk is a county in East Anglia. The top level of local government is Norfolk County Council with seven second tier councils: Breckland District Council, Broadland District Council, Great Yarmouth Borough Council, King's Lynn and West Norfolk Borough Council, North Norfolk District Council, Norwich City Council and South Norfolk District Council. The county is bounded by Cambridgeshire, Suffolk, Lincolnshire and the North Sea.

Interest
B = site of biological interest
G = site of geological interest

Public access
FP = access to footpaths through the site only
NO = no public access to site
PL = public access at limited times
PP = public access to part of site
YES = public access to all or most of the site

Other classifications
AONB = Area of Outstanding Natural Beauty
GCR = Geological Conservation Review
LNR = Local nature reserve
NCR = Nature Conservation Review site
NNR = National nature reserve
NT = National Trust
NWT = Norfolk Wildlife Trust
Ramsar = Ramsar site, an internationally important wetland site
RHPG= Register of Historic Parks and Gardens of Special Historic Interest in England
RSPB = Royal Society for the Protection of Birds
SAC = Special Area of Conservation
SM = Scheduled monument
SPA = Special Protection Area under the European Union Directive on the Conservation of Wild Birds
SWT = Suffolk Wildlife Trust
WWT = Wildfowl & Wetlands Trust

Sites

See also

List of Local Nature Reserves in Norfolk
National Nature Reserves in Norfolk

Notes

References

Sources

 
Norfolk
Sites of Special Scientific Interest
Geology of Norfolk